Stane Granda (born April 8, 1948) is a Slovene historian.

Granda was born in Novo Mesto. He received a bachelor's degree in history from the University of Ljubljana's Faculty of Arts in 1973. From 1973 to 1979 he worked at the Institute of Contemporary History, and since then has worked at the Milko Kos Historical Institute at the Slovenian Academy of Sciences and Arts. He primarily studies rural history and the effects of the Revolutions of 1848 in Slovenian territory.

In January 2006, Granda was selected to head the programming management board at the broadcaster RTV Slovenija.

Selected works
 Dolenjska v revolucionarnem letu 1848/49 (Lower Carniola in the Revolutionary Year 1848/49; Novo Mesto, 1995)
 Prva odločitev Slovencev za Slovenijo: dokumenti z uvodno študijo in osnovnimi pojasnili (The First Decision by the Slovenians for Slovenia: Documents with an Introductory Study and Basic Explanations; Ljubljana, 1999)
 Novo mesto (Novo Mesto, revised edition; Novo Mesto, 2007)
 Slovenia: An Historical Overview (Ljubljana, 2008)
 Slovenija: pogled na njeno zgodovino (Slovenia: A View of Its History; Ljubljana, 2008)
 Mala zgodovina Slovenije (A Brief History of Slovenia; Celje, 2008)

References

1948 births
Living people
20th-century Slovenian historians
Academic staff of the University of Nova Gorica
21st-century Slovenian historians